Gordonsville is an unincorporated community near the town of Florenceville-Bristol in the west of the Canadian province of New Brunswick.

Etymology 
Gordonsville may have been named for Charles Gordon Glass, who founded both this settlement and nearby Glassville (which is also named for him) in 1881.

Navigator

References 

Unincorporated communities in New Brunswick
Communities in Carleton County, New Brunswick